Anneli Wahlgren  (born 15 January 1971) is a female former Swedish football forward.

She was part of the Sweden women's national football team at the 1996 Summer Olympics, but did not play.
On club level she played for Bälinge IF.

See also
 Sweden at the 1996 Summer Olympics

References

External links
 Women's Olympic Rosters Soccer America, 18 July 1996

1971 births
Living people
Swedish women's footballers
Place of birth missing (living people)
Women's association football forwards
Olympic footballers of Sweden
Footballers at the 1996 Summer Olympics
Sweden women's international footballers